TSMU may stand for:
 Tbilisi State Medical University, a medical university in Tbilisi, Georgia
 Ternopil State Medical University, a medical university in Ternopil, Ukraine